Hilario Chávez Joya (January 22, 1928 – March 4, 2010) was the Roman Catholic bishop of the Roman Catholic Diocese of Nuevo Casas Grandes, Mexico.

Ordained on October 22, 1950, Chávez Joya was appointed bishop of the territorial prelate of Nuevo Casas Grandes on April 13, 1978, and was ordained on July 7, 1978. He became the first bishop when the territorial prelate became a diocese on June 3, 2000, retiring on May 22, 2004.

He was known for his love for soccer and a few times he was seen playing with a football in the local seminary in Nuevo Casas Grandes.

He was found dead on his bed, due to diabetes, in a seminary in Leon, Guanajuato on March 4, 2010.

Notes

21st-century Roman Catholic bishops in Mexico
1928 births
2010 deaths
20th-century Roman Catholic bishops in Mexico